The Romance of a Dixie Belle is a 1911 American silent film produced by Kalem Company and distributed by General Film. It was directed by Sidney Olcott with Gene Gauntier in the leading roles.

Cast
 Gene Gauntier - Shirley

Production notes
 The film was shot in Jacksonville, Florida.

External links

 The Romance of a Dixie Belle website dedicated to Sidney Olcott

1911 films
Silent American drama films
American silent short films
Films shot in Jacksonville, Florida
Films directed by Sidney Olcott
1911 short films
1911 drama films
American black-and-white films
1910s American films
1910s English-language films
American drama short films